Night Mother or variation, may refer to:

 'night, Mother (play), a 1982 U.S. stageplay by Marsha Norman
 night, Mother (film), a 1986 U.S. film based on the 1982 play
 "Night, Mother" (CSI: NY), a 2004 season 1 number 10 episode 10 of U.S. TV series CSI:New York

See also

 Mōdraniht, an Anglo-Saxon pagan festival
 
 Mother Night (disambiguation)
 Mother (disambiguation)
 Night (disambiguation)